The New Zealand Figure Skating Championships are a figure skating competition held annually to determine the national champions of New Zealand. Skaters compete in the disciplines of men's singles, ladies' singles, pair skating, and ice dancing from the juvenile level to senior. Not all categories are held in every year due to a lack of entries. The event is organized by the New Zealand Ice Figure Skating Association (NZIFSA).

Senior medalists

Men

Ladies

Pairs

Ice dancing

Junior medalists

Men

Ladies

Ice dancing

References

External links
 Competition Results: 1999 - Present

 
Figure skating national championships
Figure skating in New Zealand